Byron Brett Gideon (born August 8, 1963) is an American former Major League Baseball player. A pitcher, Gideon played for the Pittsburgh Pirates and Montreal Expos.

A 1987 single in his only at-bat left Gideon with a rare MLB career batting average of 1.000.

External links

1963 births
Living people
American expatriate baseball players in Canada
Baseball players from Texas
Buffalo Bisons (minor league) players
Canton-Akron Indians players
Harrisburg Senators players
Indianapolis Indians players
Macon Pirates players
Major League Baseball pitchers
Mary Hardin–Baylor Crusaders baseball players
Montreal Expos players
Nashua Pirates players
People from Crockett County, Texas
Pittsburgh Pirates players
Prince William Pirates players
West Palm Beach Expos players